Nándor Balaskó (August 30, 1918 – June 28, 1996) was a sculptor from Romania.

Balaskó graduated from Silvania National College in 1937. He studied at the Bucharest National University of Arts (1937–40) and the Hungarian University of Fine Arts (1940–43). Then he worked with Ion Andreescu Institute of Fine and Decorative Art in Cluj Napoca. In 1958 he took part in the International Auschwitz-contest. In 1970, Balaskó emigrated to Sintra, Portugal.

Exhibitions
Solo Exhibitions 
 1968 • Little Gallery of Fine Arts, Cluj-Napoca
 1990 • Lisbon

Selected group exhibitions
 1940, Bucharest, student festival
 1941, 1942, 1943, Budapest
 1943, Cluj-Napoca.

Works in public places
 Monument to Endre Ady, Zalău (1957).

Honours 
 In Sălacea there is the Balaskó Nándor primary and secondary school and a kindergarten.

Bibliography 
Szántó Tibor: Blaskó Nándor és Losonczi Nándor lipcsei vizsgamunkái. Magyar Grafika, 1964/. sz. 17-22. p.
Vámfalvi M.: Felkerestük műtermében Blaskó Nándort. Új Élet, 1967
Szőcs István: Balaskó Nándor. Helikon, 1991/10.
Orbán István: Virágok vetélkedése. Egy Balaskó-szoborkompozíció nyomában. Művelődés, 2006/1. sz.

References

External links 
  Ady Endre, Balaskó Nándor, 1957

1918 births
1996 deaths
People from Sălacea
Romanian people of Hungarian descent
Hungarian University of Fine Arts alumni
20th-century Romanian sculptors